Bernhardine Nienau (20 April 1926, Dortmund — 5 October 1943, Munich), called Bernile, was a German girl who became known as "the Führer's child" because of her close friendship with Adolf Hitler that lasted from 1933 to 1938.

Early life 
Nienau was born in Dortmund as the only child of Bernhard Nienau, a physician (June 23, 1887 - February 29, 1926). Her father died shortly before she was born. Her mother Karoline, née Helwig, a nurse (March 15, 1892 - July 26, 1962), moved to Munich and bought a house there, around 1928. Bernile's grandmother Ida Voit, a Roman Catholic teacher of Jewish descent, née Morgenstern (18 July 1867 - 29 December 1942) also lived with them.

Interaction with Hitler 
Probably at the instigation of her mother, Bernile, whose birthday was, like Hitler's, 20 April, pressed in the spring of 1933 in the forefront of the stream of visitors on Obersalzberg to grab Hitler's attention. From that contact she developed a "friendship" that lasted until 1938. In the Federal Archives in Berlin there are 17 letters which the girl wrote, probably with the help of her mother, between 18 January 1935 and 12 November 1939, to Hitler and his chief aide Wilhelm Brückner. An extract:

Munich, September 27, 36. Dear Uncle Brückner! Today I have a lot to tell you. During the holidays we were on the Obersalzberg and I was twice allowed to dear Uncle Hitler! Unfortunately, you have never been up. [...] I am already working on the Christmas work. [...] Uncle Hitler I knit some socks again because I asked him if they fit him last year. He said yes! This year I can knit with finer wool, mum only helps me with the heel. They are going to be very warm, and where he always travels so much, his feet will not feel cold. [...] Mummy also sends you greetings and many greetings and kisses from your Bernile!

The fact that Bernile's grandmother and mother were Jewish was already known to Hitler in 1933. On 19 April 1938, Hitler's adjutant Fritz Wiedemann described Hitler's disregard for her Jewish ancestry to subordinate party offices as "a purely human attitude toward the child". However, when Martin Bormann got wind of the lack of "German-bloodedness", the girl and her mother were forbidden to appear in Berghof. Hitler learned about it because his personal photographer Heinrich Hoffmann complained that Bormann had forbidden him to continue to publish photos showing the Führer as "his child". In his book "Hitler as I Saw Him", Hoffmann writes that Hitler said about Bormann: "There are people who have a true talent to spoil my every joy." While Hoffmann's illustrated book Youth around Hitler which included the photographs of Hitler with Bernile continued to sell, around May 1938 the mother was officially asked to stop any contacts with party leaders.

Bernile, who learned the profession of a technical draftsman, died on 5 October 1943 at 17 in Schwabing Hospital of spinal poliomyelitis. Her grave is located on the Munich West Cemetery.

References

External links 
 Justina Schreiber: Das blonde Mädel Bernile Nienau. Bayerischer Rundfunk, 27 October 2013
 Remarkable tale of Hitler's young Jewish friend, bbc.com, November 13, 2018.
 Up for auction: Photo of Hitler embracing young girl he knew was Jewish Rosa Bernile Nienau became known as the Fuhrer's ‘sweetheart’; Nazi leader maintained contact with her until 1938, By Stuart Winer, November 11, 2018.

Adolf Hitler
People from Dortmund
1926 births
1943 deaths
German people of Jewish descent
Deaths from polio
Infectious disease deaths in Germany